SMX may refer to:

As an abbreviation:
 SMX (operating system), a Unix-like simulator on SPARC, the "SunOS/Solaris MINIX"
 Standard Musical Expression, a representation of simple music in ASCII that was used in some DOS software such as QBasic 
 SMX Convention Center (company), an events venue management company in the Philippines
 SMX Convention Center Manila, Pasay, Philippines
 Sulfamethoxazole, an antibiotic
 Honda S-MX, a minivan
 Spatial multiplexing, MIMO wireless transmission technique
 Singapore Mercantile Exchange
 SmX RNA and SmY RNA, ribonucleic acids in nematode worms
 S.M.X., director of Revelation at the 1999 New York Underground Film Festival
 StepManiaX, a rhythm game by Step Revolution

As a code:
 Santa Maria Public Airport, in California, US, IATA code
 C.A.I. First, regional Italian airline, ICAO airline code
 SMTC Corporation, Canada, TSX/Toronto ticker code
 Sanmenxia city in Henan, China, governmental code SMX
 Sendmail X, now MeTA1, mail server coded smX
 Special Mobile Machine—Exempt, prefix SMX, on vehicle registration plates of Colorado